Iqbal Samad (born June 17, 1983 in Gowa Regency) is an Indonesian footballer who currently plays for Persiba Balikpapan in the Indonesia Soccer Championship.

Club statistics

References

External links

1983 births
Association football defenders
Living people
Indonesian footballers
Liga 1 (Indonesia) players
Bontang F.C. players
Persiba Balikpapan players
PSM Makassar players
People from Gowa Regency
Sportspeople from South Sulawesi